Hawn is a surname. Notable people with the surname include:

Goldie Hawn (born 1945), American actress
Laurie Hawn (born 1947), Canadian Air Force officer and politician
Rick Hawn (born 1976), American judoka and mixed martial artist
William R. Hawn (1910–1995), American businessman, philanthropist, race horse owner and breeder

See also
Hawn State Park, state park of Missouri, United States